Hunters is an American conspiracy drama television series created by David Weil. It premiered on February 21, 2020, on Amazon Prime Video. In August 2020, the series was renewed for a second and final season which premiered on January 13, 2023.

Premise 
The series' characters draw from a number of real Nazi hunters through the decades, but are not meant to be a specific representation of any of them. It follows a diverse band of Nazi hunters living in 1977 New York City who discover that numerous escaped Nazi officers are conspiring to create a Fourth Reich in the United States. A parallel plot element is the discovery of Operation Paperclip, the U.S. government operation relocating German scientists (many of them Nazis) to the U.S.

Cast and characters

Main 
 Logan Lerman as Jonah Heidelbaum, a young mathematics genius who takes his grandmother's place among the Hunters. Lerman joined the project due to the involvements of Jordan Peele, Alfonso Gomez-Rejon, David Weil, and Nikki Toscano, and the series' moral dilemma of being bad to fight evil.
 Al Pacino as Meyer Offerman, a Polish-Jewish philanthropist and Holocaust survivor who recruits and leads the Hunters. It is Pacino's first-ever TV series lead role; said the long-time actor, "I missed out on some great television offers I had in the past because the whole thing was: 'You don't do television.' That's what the advisors would say early on. I'm talking 30 years ago." Creator David Weil, who created Hunters because his grandparents were both Holocaust survivors, describing writing Meyer as "me meeting my grandfather for the first time, and that was a really beautiful and kind of powerful thing."
 Lena Olin as Eva Braun-Hitler / The Colonel, leader of the Fourth Reich and Hitler's wife.
 Jerrika Hinton as Millie Morris, an FBI agent who stumbles onto the Fourth Reich and the Hunters during a murder investigation. Hinton focused the most on the character's overwhelming faith on powerful institutions meant to protect citizens, such as the FBI. In studying the role as well as the nature of the FBI in the 1970s, she had conversations with a black woman who was an FBI agent in the 1970s like Millie, named Jerri Williams, which, in Hinton's words, were "monumentally helpful." 
 Saul Rubinek as Murray Markowitz (season 1), Mindy's husband and the Hunters' electronics expert; a German-Jewish Holocaust survivor.
 Carol Kane as Mindy Markowitz, Murray's wife and the Hunters' signals expert; a German-Jewish Holocaust survivor.
 Josh Radnor as Lonny Flash, an actor and master of disguises for the Hunters.
 Greg Austin as Travis Leich, an American Neo-Nazi acolyte drawn into the Fourth Reich. Austin chose the role after doing many prior ones very close to his empathetic real-life personality, and wanting to challenge himself playing the opposite of that; he studied psychopathic characters in various television series, as well as the real-life Ted Bundy, for his role. 
 Tiffany Boone as Roxy Jones, a member of the Hunters who specializes in counterfeiting and forgery.
 Louis Ozawa as Joe Mizushima, a Vietnam War veteran and the Hunters' combat expert. He turns against the Hunters in Season 2 after being kidnapped by The Colonel.
 Kate Mulvany as Sister Harriet, a former MI6 operative who now works with the Hunters; a former German-Jewish child refugee named Rebecca.
 Dylan Baker as Biff Simpson, an Undersecretary of State in the Carter administration and secretly an undercover Nazi agent. (season 1, guest season 2)
 Jennifer Jason Leigh (season 2) as Chava "Ima" Apfelbaum, a Jewish Nazi hunter, Ruth's sister and Jonah's great-aunt.
 Udo Kier (season 2; stand-in guest season 1) as Adolf Hitler, the former Führer of the Third Reich, who faked his death, and mastermind of the Fourth Reich.
 Emily Rudd (season 2) as Clara, Jonah's fiancée.

Recurring 
 Christian Oliver as the young Wilhelm Zuchs, "The Wolf", a Nazi doctor at Auschwitz who tormented both Meyer and Jonah's grandmother Ruth
 Victor Williams as Detective Kennedy Groton
 Jonno Davies as Tobias, the Colonel's body man
 James LeGros as Hank Grimsby, former OSS operative and now Millie's boss at the FBI
 Ebony Obsidian as Carol Lockhart
 Caleb Emery as Arthur "Bootyhole" McGuigan
 Henry Hunter Hall as Sherman "Cheeks" Johnson
 Jeannie Berlin as Ruth Heidelbaum, Jonah's grandmother and a survivor of Auschwitz
 Julissa Bermudez as Maria, Millie's girlfriend and a nurse
 Becky Ann Baker as Commerce Secretary Juanita M. Kreps
 Celia Weston as Dottie
 Joshua Satine as Aaron Markowitz

Guests 
 Josh Mostel as Rabbi Steckler
 Barbara Sukowa as Tilda Sauer
 Judd Hirsch as Simon Wiesenthal
 Keir Dullea as Klaus Rhinehart
 William Sadler as Friedrich Mann
 John Noble as Fredric Hauser
 Victor Slezak as Wernher Von Braun
 Jérôme Charvet as Armand
 Jim Meskimen as Judge Wolfgang Müeller
 Veronika Nowag-Jones as Gretel Fischer, a NASA scientist killed in the first episode and investigated by Millie Morris
 Max MacKenzie as Markus Roth

Episodes

Season 1 (2020)

Season 2 (2023)

Context 
Digital Spy writer David Opie considered a show about Jewish heroes like Hunters important, due to the marginalization of the Jewish religion in the fictional superhero landscape. While there are many Jewish comic book heroes, including Scarlet Witch, Kitty Pryde, the Thing, and Harley Quinn, the Jewish aspect of their lives is almost always marginalized.

The Jewish David Weil noted "casual" forms of anti-semitism taking place throughout his life, such as jokes about "Jews in ovens" and swastikas sprayed on his high school. Hunters is also far from the first piece of media to involve protagonists hunting down Nazis, as those have included films like The Odessa File (1974), Apt Pupil (1998), The Boys from Brazil (1978), and Marathon Man (1976), as well as content regarding Nazi zombies.

Production

Development 

Creator David Weil's inspiration for Hunters was bedtime stories of World War II experiences told by his grandmother Sarah, who was a survivor of the Auschwitz camp Birkenau; the stories had a long-lasting impact on David because they were about "great good vs. terrifying evil" and had themes of "hope, courage and survival," elements he also noticed in comic book superhero stories he would read. Additional reasons for creating the show were a "lack of Jewish superheroes" in film and television, citing examples of films about Nazi Germany like Inglourious Basterds (2009) and Schindler's List (1993) having non-Jewish protagonists, and a desire to expose "hidden truths" and to help those "who've always felt persecuted, who linger with trauma and injustice" in response to "rising anti-Semistism, racism, xenophobia."

Despite the attachment of Get Out director Jordan Peele and Weil having an "80-page bible" of the show written, most buyers were wary of the project and refused to purchase it; the creator suggested that it was due to the series' premise of "a diverse band of 'others' kind of rising up and trying to reclaim power in some way" not being typical in mainstream entertainment. Amazon Studios head Jen Salke bought the series. Nikki Toscano joined as producer for its ambitious concept: "I think that the juxtaposition of the 1970s New York City with the Holocaust, with some of the levity and the humour, was certainly a challenge for us to balance throughout. But it was a challenge that I thought was an obstacle worth trying to get over."

On May 17, 2018, it was announced that Amazon Video had given the production a straight-to-series order for a first season consisting of ten episodes. Weil was set to executive produce alongside Jordan Peele, Tom Lesinski, Jenna Santoianni, and Win Rosenfeld. Weil was also expected to write for the series as well. Production companies involved with the series were slated to consist of Monkeypaw Productions and Sonar Entertainment. On August 7, 2018, it was announced that Nikki Toscano had joined the production as an executive producer and would also serve as co-showrunner alongside Weil. On August 3, 2020, Amazon renewed the series for a second and final season which was released on January 13, 2023.

Casting 
On December 13, 2018, it was reported that Logan Lerman was in talks for a lead role in the series, Jonah Heidelbaum. On January 10, 2019, it was reported that Al Pacino was finalizing a deal for a starring role in the series. On February 7, 2019, it was reported that Jerrika Hinton, Dylan Baker, Lena Olin, Greg Austin, Catherine Tate, Tiffany Boone, Saul Rubinek, and Carol Kane were in various stages of negotiations to join the cast of the series. Four days later, it was announced that Boone had officially joined the cast. Josh Radnor was cast in March. In April 2019, Kate Mulvany, James LeGros, Ebony Obsidian, Caleb Emery, Henry Hunter Hall and Jeannie Berlin joined the cast of the series, with Mulvany joining as a series regular. On April 5, 2021, Jennifer Jason Leigh was cast as a lead for the second season.

It's been noted that while not all the Jewish characters on the show are played by Jewish actors and not all the hunters are Jews, all Jewish actors out of the main cast play Jewish characters. Outside the main cast, some Jewish actors have played Jewish characters (for example, actor Zack Schor, who mentioned his survivor grandparents as the reason why he was drawn to the role of the younger Meyer Offerman, a Polish Jew in a Nazi camp), while others have played non-Jews (such as Jewish actor Kenneth Tigar who plays a Nazi).

Filming 
The bowling scene was Austin's audition scene as well as the first sequence he filmed for the series, and a continuous shot where his character talks to the congressman before bowling a strike was done within one take.

Themes and visuals 

According to Weil, "the purpose of this show is an allegorical tale in many ways, to draw the parallels between the ’30s and ’40s in Europe and the ’70s in the States and especially today with the racism and anti-Semitism and xenophobia, the likes of which we haven’t seen in decades."

As David Weil put it, "Hunters is about a group of people who are so rarely portrayed as superheroes" and incorporates iconography to show the Jewish characters as superheroes that reclaim their power; an example is the use of yellow coloring on the costumes and weapons of the hunters as a way to reclaim the color of the yellow badge as the Jews'. Weil also went for a similar heroism in the prisoners in the Auschwitz camp flashbacks.

Genre-wise, Hunters is a mix of several styles: "a harrowing remembrance of the suffering of the Holocaust, a satisfying revenge fantasy, a sensational period piece, and a dark comedy," labeled The Verges Joshua Rivera. Ben Travers of IndieWire categorized it as a black comedy thriller that's "extremely violent and extremely silly; it respects the drama inherent to any Holocaust story while still allowing fans to enjoy the fictionalized quest for vengeance. For every conversation about justice and vengeance, morality and responsibility, right and wrong, there's a fake ad about spotting Nazis or a dance sequence set to 'Staying Alive.'" Matthew Gilbert of The Boston Globe compared its comedy and look to the works of the Coen brothers and Quentin Tarantino. Prahlad Srihari, a Firstpost critic, also used one of Tarantino's works to describe it as a combination of the director's film Inglourious Basterds (2009) and Steven Spielberg's Munich (2005). Several 1970s exploitation genres are imitated in the show, such as kung fu, grindhouse, Blaxploitation, Jewsploitation, and torture porn.

Fighting individuals who committed serious crimes with actions like violence is a common moral dilemma the titular hunters deal with; Rubinek explained that this was important, as the message of the Jewish folklore of the golem is that "monster which grows violent and protects the Jews, also turns violent inappropriately and has to be put down." Weil stated that the main question of the story is, "If you hunt monsters, do you risk becoming a monster yourself?" "Some of Hunters' biggest thematic questions revolve around whether ends justify means or if the pursuit of vengeance risks corrupting those who seek it," Rivera put it more specifically. For Jonah he's "pushed and pulled between asserting himself as a hunter and, if not empathizing with the hunted, believing there's a more humane way of holding them accountable. Is Jonah naive and soft for being appalled by the team's tactics? Or is he exercising better moral judgment because he's lived outside the dehumanizing conditions they faced?" wrote Travers.

Toscano explained that she and the writers, while not sympathizing with the Nazis, were trying to portray them as humans rather than caricatures, realizing there was a "spectrum of evil that we’re dealing with. There is one extreme [and then] there are other Nazis that have various explanations: ‘I was following orders; I was as (sic) kid'".

References to pop culture are used that relates to this moral conflict; for instance, in a conversation between Jonah and his two friends after seeing Star Wars (1977), Jonah jokingly hypothesizes Darth Vader is after the Jedi rebels because he was raised to believe they would "bomb his parents, behead his friends, kidnap all the hot Galactic chicks for lightsaber orgies. Vader doesn't get up every day looking to destroy the galaxy. He gets up every morning believing he needs to save it." Jonah's friends counter-respond that Vader is still a killer despite good intentions, and Jonah responds back by saying heroes like Batman and Superman are the same way.

A chess board is also repeatedly used in the show's imagery (including in its intro) to present good vs. evil battles as a complicated game.

To differentiate from most other shows with a historical context that, to Toscano and Weil, felt "like a history lesson," the two went for a "comic book" style, with a mix of shots with "poppy" colors and shots with de-saturated, "grounded" colors; Weil explained that this was meant to present a message that what "seems like comic book" ends up "scintillating[ly] real." Generally, sequences set in the 1970s have a flashier color palette, while scenes in the Auschwitz camps have more muted colors. Gomez-Rejon came up with the idea of using windows as panels for the show. According to Lerman, the main character works at a comic book shop and one of the stories' major themes are the moral differences between comic books and real-life; for instance, "you have to be bad" instead of a superhero to defeat villains, which is Pacino's view when he trains Jonah into becoming a hunter.

As Film Inquiry describe Hunters variety of tones, "for every naturalistic colloquy, there's a bit of sparkle and levity by compiling specious footage (usually in the form of a television ad) involving the interracial and intergenerational crew of Nazi-fighters. (At one point in episode 3, Logan Lerman breaks out in a musical number.)"

Reception
Upon the release of its first season, Hunters received polarized reviews, with praise for its premise, messages, action sequences, and performances, but criticism for its story-telling, inconsistent tone, pacing, historical inaccuracies, and conclusion. A favorable review summarized the show as "audacious, tonally complex, not always in control of its message, visually arresting, and, particularly in its grim flashbacks to the brutalities and the courage in the death camps, moving," while one of its harshest detractors labeled it "uneven, awkward...often dull," and "sort of yucky."

The first season has a 65% approval rating with 112 reviews on Rotten Tomatoes, with an average rating of 6.1/10 and the following critical consensus: "Propelled by a strong cast and even stronger sense of justice, Hunters' stylish first season doesn't always hit the mark, but when it does, it strikes pulpy paydirt." Metacritic gave the first season a score of 54 out of 100 based on 41 critics, indicating "mixed or average reviews". Most of the initial reviews were for the first five episodes.

The second season has a 75% approval rating with 20 reviews on Rotten Tomatoes, with an average rating of 6.6/10 and the following critical consensus: "While it never realizes its full potential as a revenge fantasy for real historical atrocity, Hunters tracks down a satisfying enough conclusion in this second and final season." Metacritic gave the second season a score of 68 out of 100 based on 6 critics, indicating "generally favorable reviews".

The lack of development of the Hunters was a frequent criticism. Wrote Tom Long of The Detroit News, "we’re introduced to our heroes — who inexplicably include an Asian man and black women — at which point we wait around to see their super-skills. Never happens. Five episodes in none of these people seem all that good at anything." Srihari criticized Biff Simpson not being the main antagonist instead of the Colonel, "who is more Cruella de Vil than exceptionally evil, despite the season-ending pay-off," while Rivera criticized the character of Jonah, feeling that all his conflicts, such as those in his personal life, are only to serve the story: "This makes all of his big moments feel like they occur in a vacuum — especially when he’s paired up with the other Hunters."

A common praise was the cast, including for actors like Pacino, Kane and Rubinek and Olin. Travers praised the performers of the hunters, highlighting Rubinek and Kane, as well as Hinton, Baker, Olin, and the "affecting and fun" Pacino, but called Lerman and his character Jonah nothing more than an "audience stand-in" that "occasionally forgets to get off the couch and move around." Gilbert found Berlin's presence memorable and highlighted the restraint of Pacino: "He brings a lovely gentleness to the role, too, most evident in the fatherly attentions he gives to the confused, grieving, and newly mobilized Jonah. He sees generational wrath in the young man’s fury, and he fosters it." He also called Lerman "good enough if somewhat one-dimensional as Jonah."

The tone dissonance and mashing of styles turned off some reviewers. Wrote Gilbert, "the leaps from the kitschy shag-carpeted world of bell-bottoms to the spare cruelties of the camps, and from action comedy to human tragedy, are a lot." Verne Gay of Newsday opined that while Hunters was successful as a genre show, it was an "impossible balancing act" to make it both that and a "personal tribute" to those who died in the Nazi camps with its flashback sequences. Tom Long of The Detroit News wrote that, "Tonally it careens madly from sincere to silly, gory to glib," and when it came to its use of pastiche styles, "It’s as if someone took notes while watching a marathon of Quentin Tarantino movies, getting all the bits and pieces without understanding why they worked." ArtsATL was disgusted by the use of comic book references and cliches in a show with "the genocide of 6 million people in World War II" as one of its major themes.

Reviews debated Hunters revenge fantasy premise and Nazi subject matter, specifically, in 3AW s words, "the oft-raised issue about exploiting one of the most horrific man-made events in history for our entertainment. Can the show be seen as an indirect tribute to the work of Nazi-hunter Simon Wiesenthal? Or is it just bad taste? Can it be both?" Gilbert was appreciative of the "bold" inclusion of "Nazis into a broad genre-tinged entertainment," as it's also "part of the origin story of Golden Age superhero comic books themselves," and suggested it would start conversation between viewers. Other critics, even those who were engaged with the content, unfavorably opined its premise and revenge message made it a B-grade series; Srihari, in particular, categorized it as "an exploitation film that has invaded an overlong comic book movie" and that "the violence brings together the victimiser and victimised in a punishing embrace." Film Inquirys "Does that make it right? Of course not. Is it fun to watch? In all honesty, not really. It is, however, extremely aware and extremely responsive in how it tinkers with history by adding a fair amount of pathos."

A positive review by Travers, who stated that the show's violence and "twisted moments" "allow[] for a fanciful level of wish fulfillment, as well as a compelling action narrative," claimed they led the serious themes to feel non-relevant. Long dismissed Hunters as "a wildly uneven, superficial, comic book-type treatment" of the "particularly sick and unfortunately still-relevant dynamic" of American Nazism, attributing the problem to the writing being "black-and-white" and filled with stereotypes.

Srihari suggested that the series should've used "subtle and subversive" methods of dehumanizing Nazis, such as in the flashback scene where the Jewish prisoners play the Jewish folk song "Hava Nagila" instead of music by composer Richard Wagner as a Nazi officer commands them to. He also argued the comical torturing devices of the officers, such as the human chess board and the singing competition, "stops being disturbing after a while as the mayhem turns into monotony." Stover similarly opined that "the series wallows in its own jarring material to the point of lassitude."

Rivera named the show's straight-forward moments its best, such as the flashbacks in the fourth episode of a couple trying to escape the camp. Long was harsh on the flashbacks, however, suggesting that they're "supposed to provide motivation but often just looks like Jews being tortured in concentration camps." The Mary Sues Sara Clements, although agreeing with the criticisms of the flashbacks, also stated that they are essential, as "they emphasize a simple fact: We must know and must not forget what happened during the Holocaust. Even when there are no survivors left to tell their stories, we must continue in their place."

The series has received some criticism from the Auschwitz-Birkenau State Museum due to inaccurate use of the Auschwitz Concentration Camp. The scene depicting prisoners being forced to participate in a game of human chess was called out as "dangerous foolishness and caricature". The museum was also concerned that the show "welcomes future deniers". Director of the USC Shoah Foundation Stephen D. Smith heavily criticized the show and concluded that "Amazon must not renew it for a second season."

In a statement, series creator David Weil, the grandson of Holocaust survivors, responded to the criticism and spoke to wanting to tell a story about the Holocaust without borrowing from a specific survivor's real life or experience without their permission. He said, "It is true that Nazis perpetrated widespread and extreme acts of sadism and torture – and even incidents of cruel 'games' – against their victims. I simply did not want to depict those specific, real acts of trauma ... I did not want to misrepresent a real person or borrow from a specific moment in an actual person’s life. That was the responsibility that weighed on me every night and every morning for years, while writing, producing, and editing this show."

Rubinek also responded to criticisms about the show's violence, explaining that it was warning the viewers about the negative consequences of revenge violence, not promoting it: "If the theme of the show was just violence – yes, maybe they'd have a point... But it's not just about that. It's about the consequences of it."

Awards and nominations

References

Citations

Video sources

External links 
 
 Trailer

2020s American drama television series
Alternate history television series
Amazon Prime Video original programming
English-language television shows
Nazi hunters in popular culture
Nazi fugitives in popular culture
Television series set in 1977
Television series set in the 1970s
2020 American television series debuts
2023 American television series endings
American thriller television series
Neo-Nazism in the United States
Serial drama television series
Television series by Amazon Studios
Television series about the aftermath of the Holocaust
Television series about NASA
Television series about neo-Nazism
Television series about Jews and Judaism